Jeffrey St. Clair (born 1959) is an investigative journalist, writer, and editor.

Biography
St Clair was born in Indianapolis, Indiana and attended American University in Washington, D.C., majoring in English and history. He has worked as an environmental organizer and writer for Friends of the Earth, Clean Water Action, and the Hoosier Environmental Council.

In 1990, he moved to Oregon to edit the environmental magazine Forest Watch. In 1994, he joined journalists Alexander Cockburn and Ken Silverstein on CounterPunch.  He co-edited CounterPunch from 1999 to 2012 with Cockburn until the latter's death in 2012. St. Clair has served as editor since 2012, joined by managing editor Joshua Frank in 2012.

St. Clair is a former contributing editor to the monthly magazine In These Times. He has also written for The Progressive.

In 1998, he published his first book, with Cockburn, Whiteout: the CIA, Drugs and the Press, a history of the CIA's alleged ties to drug gangs from World War II to the Mujahideen and Nicaraguan Contras. This was followed by A Field Guide to Environmental Bad Guys (with James Ridgeway), and with Cockburn, Five Days that Shook the World: Seattle and Beyond, and Al Gore: a User's Manual. St. Clair wrote the books, Been Brown So Long It Looked Like Green to Me: the Politics of Nature, Grand Theft Pentagon, and Born Under a Bad Sky: Notes from the Dark Side of the Earth. His book, Bernie and the Sandernistas: Field Notes from a Failed Revolution, was published in late-2016.

St. Clair lives in Oregon City, Oregon.

Works
With Alexander Cockburn
 Whiteout: The CIA, Drugs and the Press  (Verso, 1998) 
 Al Gore: A User's Manual (Verso, 2000)  
 Five Days That Shook The World: The Battle for Seattle and Beyond (Verso, 2000) 
 The Politics of Anti-Semitism, co-edited (AK Press, 2003) 
 Imperial Crusades: Iraq, Afghanistan and Yugoslavia (Verso, 2004) 
 Serpents in the Garden: Liaisons with Culture and Sex: CounterPunch Anthology, co-edited (AK Press, 2004) 

Other
 With James Ridgeway - A Pocket Guide to Environmental Bad Guys (Basic Books, 1999) 
 Been Brown So Long, It Looked Like Green to Me: The Politics of Nature (Common Courage Press, 2003) 
 Grand Theft Pentagon :Tales of Corruption and Profiteering in the War on Terror (Common Courage Press, 2005) 
 Born Under a Bad Sky: Notes from the Dark Side of the Earth (AK Press, 2007) 
 Co-editor with Joshua Frank - Red State Rebels: Tales of Grassroots Resistance in the Heartland (AK Press, 2008) 
 Co-editor with Joshua Frank - Hopeless: Barack Obama and the Politics of Illusion (AK Press, 2013) 
 Co-editor with Kevin Alexander Gray and JoAnn Wypijewski - Killing Travons: An Anthology of American Violence (CounterPunch via CreateSpace, 2014) 
 Bernie and the Sandernistas: Field Notes From a Failed Revolution. (CounterPunch via CreateSpace, 2016)

References

External links

 "Monkeywrench Hope: An Interview with Jeffrey St. Clair", by Joshua Frank, Press Action, August 19, 2004, retrieved 25 April 2007
 Notes from the Dark Side of Earth Jeffrey St. Clair speaks about his books and views in Sacramento, CA on July 15, 2008
 "Q&A: Jeffrey St Clair" by Ben Terrall, Terrain, Winter 2008, retrieved 25 April 2013

1959 births
Living people
American alternative journalists
American male journalists
American non-fiction environmental writers
American political writers
American University alumni
Newsletter publishers (people)
People from Oregon City, Oregon
Journalists from Oregon